A medical surge occurs when "patient volumes challenge or exceed a hospital's servicing capacity"—often but not always tied to high volume of patients in a hospital's emergency room. Medical surges can occur after a mass casualty incident. In a poll by the American College of Emergency Physicians (ACEP) in May 2018, 93% of doctors said their US emergency rooms were not fully prepared for medical surges. 6% said their emergency departments were fully prepared.

Hospital preparation 
Some hospitals, such as San Francisco General Hospital, have medical surge exercises to train staff.

Medical Surge Capacity
In February 2019, the American Hospital Association released a report that medical surge capacity was one of four major challenges threatening rural hospitals' ability to provide care, along with the "opioid epidemic," violence in the community, and cyber threats.

According to the U.S. Department of Health & Human Services, medical surge capacity is "the ability to evaluate increased volume of patients .The requirements of surge may extend beyond direct patient care to include such tasks as extensive laboratory studies or epidemiological investigations. This is related to patients volume and  identifying numbers of hospital beds, personnel, supplies, and equipment should be identified and addressed."

Medical Surge Capability
According to the U.S. Department of Health & Human Services, medical surge capability required "special intervention to protect medical providers, other patients, and the integrity of the HCO. This is also the ability to manage patients requiring specialized medical care and evaluation." Notable examples include influxes of patients with SARS.

References 

Traumatology
Emergency medicine
Triage
Disaster medicine